Svenska Cupen 1947 was the seventh season of the main Swedish football Cup. The competition was concluded on 24 August 1947 with the Final, held at Råsunda Stadium, Solna in Stockholms län. Malmö FF won 3-2 against AIK before an attendance of 26,705 spectators.

Preliminary round 1

For other results see SFS-Bolletinen - Matcher i Svenska Cupen.

Preliminary round 2

For other results see SFS-Bolletinen - Matcher i Svenska Cupen.

Preliminary round 3

For other results see SFS-Bolletinen - Matcher i Svenska Cupen.

First round

For other results see SFS-Bolletinen - Matcher i Svenska Cupen.

Second round
The 8 matches in this round were played between 4 and 6 July 1947.

Quarter-finals
The 4 matches in this round were played on 12 and 13 July 1947.

Semi-finals
The semi-finals in this round were played on 20 July 1947.

Final
The final was played on 24 August 1947 at the Råsunda Stadium.

Footnotes

References 

1947
Cup
Sweden